Dragan Sestic (born 9 September 1974) is an Australian handball player. He competed in the men's tournament at the 2000 Summer Olympics. He is the brother of Sasa Sestic.

References

External links
 

1974 births
Living people
Australian male handball players
Olympic handball players of Australia
Handball players at the 2000 Summer Olympics
Sportspeople from Banja Luka
Australian people of Serbian descent